Meymand (also Romanized as Maymand, Meimand and Maimand) is a village in Meymand Rural District, in the Central District of Shahr-e Babak County, Kerman Province, Iran. At the 2006 census, its population was 673, in 181 families.

Meymand is an ancient village which is located near Shahr-e Babak city in Kerman Province, Iran. Meymand is believed to be a primary human residence in the Iranian Plateau, dating back to 12,000 years ago. Many of the residents live in the 350 hand-dug houses amid the rocks, some of which have been inhabited for as long as 3,000 years. Stone engravings nearly 10,000 years old are found around the village, and deposits of pottery nearly 6,000 years old attest to the long history of settlement at the village site.

Regarding the origin of these structures two theories have been suggested:
According to the first theory, this village was built by a group of the Aryan tribe about 800 to 700 years B.C. and at the same time with the Median era. It is possible that the cliff structures of Meymand were built for religious purposes. Worshippers of Mithras believe that the sun is invincible and this guided them to consider mountains as sacred. Hence the stone cutters and architects of Meymand have set their beliefs out in the construction of their dwellings. 
Based on the second theory the village dates back to the second or third century A.D. During the Arsacid era different tribes of southern Kerman migrated in different directions. Although, these theories do not coincide with the data of deposits found 12,000 years ago, which would take the site to circa 10,000BC. These tribes found suitable places for living and settled in those areas by building their shelters which developed in time into the existing homes. The existence of a place known as the fortress of Meymand, near the village, in which more than 150 ossuaries (bone-receptacle) of the Sassanid period were found, strengthens this theory.

Living conditions in Meymand are harsh due to the aridity of the land and to high temperatures in summers and very cold winters. The local language contains many words from the ancient Sassanid and Pahlavi languages.

In 2005, Meymand was awarded the UNESCO-Greece Melina Mercouri International Prize for the Safeguarding and Management of Cultural Landscapes (about $20,000).

On 4 July 2015, the village was added to the UNESCO World Heritage Sites list.

References

External links

Populated places in Shahr-e Babak County
World Heritage Sites in Iran
Tourist attractions in Kerman Province